Pineham may refer to two places in England:
Pineham, Milton Keynes, a district in Broughton parish
 Pineham, Kent, a settlement in Whitfield parish